Takechi no Kurohito (高市黒人) was a Japanese waka poet of the Nara period.

Biography 
The year of Takechi no Kurohito's birth is unknown. His kabane was Muraji.

He appears to have spent his career as a low-ranking civil servant.

It is unknown when he died.

Poetry 
16 poems in the Man'yōshū are attributed to him, all of them tanka. The poems are those numbered 58, 70, 270–277, 279–280, 283, 305, 1718, and 4016.

Notes

References

Citations

Works cited 

 
 
 
 
 
 
 
 
 
 

Year of birth unknown
Year of death unknown
Man'yō poets
Japanese male poets